Buipe is a small town and is the capital of Central Gonja District, a district in the Savannah Region of north Ghana.

Because of the proximity of limestone deposits, Buipe is the proposed location of a cement works. The Black Volta, one of the most important rivers in the country passes through the town, making Buipe one of the leading market centers in the northern part of Ghana.

References

External links
 Central Gonja District

Populated places in the Savannah Region (Ghana)